= Weingartnerfels =

Mountain in Germany

Coordinates: 49°31′27″N 12°37′55″E

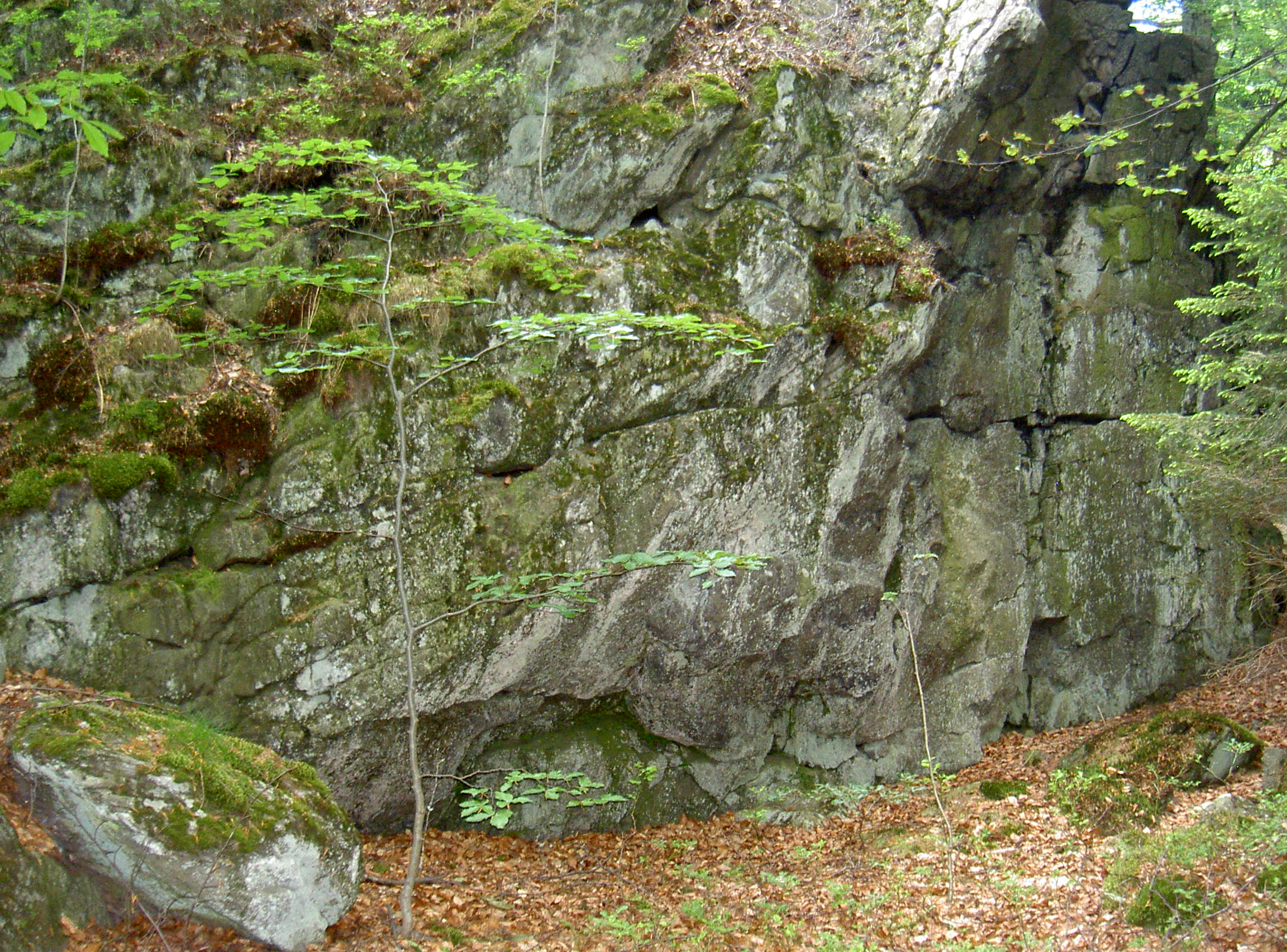
- Weingartnerfels.

Highest point
- Elevation: 896 m (2,940 ft)

Geography
- Location: Bavaria, Germany

Weingartnerfels is a mountain of Bavaria, Germany.
